MotorCycle is the tenth studio album by Christian alternative rock band Daniel Amos, issued in 1993 on BAI Records. It was the band's first album under the Daniel Amos moniker - as opposed to the shortened DA - since Vox Humana in 1984.

The album saw the band temporarily shift their sound to neo-psychedelia and saw the return of longtime guitarist Jerry Chamberlain. The album was dedicated to the memory of singer-songwriter Mark Heard, who died in 1992. Writing for AllMusic, J. Edward Keyes described the album as "meticulously crafted, haunting, and beautiful beyond words ... a psych-pop tour de force."

"Grace is the Smell of Rain" was later rerecorded by lead singer Terry Scott Taylor's other band, the Lost Dogs, for their 2004 album MUTT.

Track listing 

 "Banquet at the World's End" (words and music by Taylor) (3:47)
 "Traps, Ensnares" (words and music by Taylor/Chamberlain) (3:49)
 "Hole in the World" (words and music by Taylor) (5:32)
 "(What's Come) Over Me" (words and music by Taylor) (3:48)
 "Buffalo Hills" (words and music by Taylor) (4:24)
 "Guilty" (words and music by Taylor) (4:35)
 "Motorcycle" (words by Taylor, music by Taylor/Flesch/Chandler) (3:33)
 "Wonderful" (words by Taylor/Chamberlain/McCall, music by Taylor/Chamberlain) (2:16)
 "So Long" (words and music by Taylor) (0:56)
 "My Frontier" (words and music by Taylor) (3:48)
 "Grace is the Smell of Rain" (words by Taylor, music by Taylor/Chamberlain) (4:01)
 "Noelle"  (words and music by Taylor) (2:43)
 "Wise Acres"  (words and music by Taylor) (2:14)
 "So Long Again" (words by Taylor, music by Taylor/Chamberlain) (2:53)

Personnel 

 Jerry Chamberlain — lead and rhythm guitars, lap-steel guitar, electric sitar, backing vocals, lead vocal on "Wonderful", cover concept
 Tim Chandler — bass guitar and backing vocals
 Greg Flesch — lead and rhythm guitars, pan flute, and squeeze box
 Ed McTaggart — drums, percussion, backing vocals, art direction
 Terry Scott Taylor — guitars, harmonica, lead vocals, backing vocals, cover concept
 Gene Eugene — piano, audio engineer
 Steve Hindalong  — additional percussion
 Buckeye Dan Michaels  — trumpet
 Rob Watson — piano, organ, and synthesizer
 Sharon McCall — backing vocals
 Bob Moon — additional engineer
 Dave Hackbarth — additional engineer
 Chris Colbert — additional engineer
 The Golden Recording Room, Huntington Beach, California — recording location, mixing location
 Neverland Studios, Cerritos, California — recording location
 McCrums, Whittier, California — recording location
 Doug Doyle — mastering
 Digital Brothers — mastering location
 Bruce Heavin — cover concept, illustration
 Daniel Amos — musical arrangements
 Wax Lips Studios — pre-production demo recording location

References 

1993 albums
Daniel Amos albums